This is a bibliography of books, plays, films, and libretti written, edited, or translated by the Anglo-American poet W. H. Auden (1907–1973). See the main entry for a list of biographical and critical studies and external links.

Publications by W. H. Auden

In the list below, works reprinted in the Complete Works of W. H. Auden are indicated by footnote references.

Books and selected pamphlets
 Poems (London, 1928; privately printed; different contents from 1930 volume with the same title) (dedicated to Christopher Isherwood).
 Poems (London, 1930; second edn., seven poems substituted, London, 1933; includes poems and Paid on Both Sides: A Charade)  (dedicated to Christopher Isherwood).
 The Orators: An English Study (London, 1932, verse and prose; slightly revised edn., London, 1934; revised edn. with new preface, London, 1966; New York 1967) (dedicated to Stephen Spender).
 The Dance of Death (London, 1933, play) (dedicated to Robert Medley and Rupert Doone).
 Poems (New York, 1934; contains Poems [1933 edition], The Orators [1932 edition], and The Dance of Death).
 The Dog Beneath the Skin (London, New York, 1935; play, with Christopher Isherwood) (dedicated to Robert Moody).
 The Ascent of F6 (London, 1936; 2nd edn., 1937; New York, 1937; play, with Christopher Isherwood) (dedicated to John Bicknell Auden).
 Look, Stranger! (London, 1936, poems; US edn., On This Island, New York, 1937) (dedicated to Erika Mann)
 Spain (London, 1937; pamphlet poem).
 Letters from Iceland (London, New York, 1937; verse and prose, with Louis MacNeice) (dedicated to George Augustus Auden).
 On the Frontier (London, 1938; New York, 1939; play, with Christopher Isherwood) (dedicated to Benjamin Britten).
Selected Poems (London, 1938) (selected by Auden from previously published work)
 Education: Today - and Tomorrow (London, 1939; journalism, with T. C. Worsley)
 Journey to a War (London, New York, 1939; verse and prose, with Christopher Isherwood) (dedicated to E. M. Forster).
 Another Time (London, New York 1940; poetry) (dedicated to Chester Kallman).
 Some Poems (London, 1940)) (not selected by Auden)
 The Double Man (New York, 1941, poems; UK edn., New Year Letter, London, 1941) (Dedicated to Elizabeth Mayer).
 For the Time Being (New York, 1944; London, 1945; two long poems: "The Sea and the Mirror: A Commentary on Shakespeare's The Tempest", dedicated to James and Tania Stern, and "For the Time Being: A Christmas Oratorio", in memoriam Constance Rosalie Auden [Auden's mother]).
 The Collected Poetry of W.H. Auden (New York, 1945; includes new poems) (dedicated to Christopher Isherwood and Chester Kallman).
 The Age of Anxiety: A Baroque Eclogue (New York, 1947; London, 1948; verse; won the 1948 Pulitzer Prize for Poetry) (dedicated to John Betjeman).
 The Enchafèd Flood (New York, 1950; London, 1951; prose) (dedicated to Alan Ansen).
 Collected Shorter Poems, 1930-1944 (London, 1950; similar to 1945 Collected Poetry) (dedicated to Christopher Isherwood and Chester Kallman).
 Nones (New York, 1951; London, 1952; poems) (dedicated to Reinhold and Ursula Niebuhr)
 Mountains. (1954) (pamphlet edition of a single poem, included in The Shield of Achilles)
 The Shield of Achilles (New York, London, 1955; poems; won the 1956 National Book Award for Poetry) (dedicated to Lincoln and Fidelma Kirstein).
 The Old Man's Road (New York, 1956; pamphlet with poems, all included in Homage to Clio).
 W. H. Auden: A Selection by the Author (Harmondsworth, 1958; New York, 1959, as Selected Poetry of W. H. Auden) (includes some new revisions to previously published poems)
 Homage to Clio (New York, London, 1960; poems) (dedicated to E. R. and A. E. Dodds).
 The Dyer's Hand (New York, 1962; London, 1963; essays) (dedicated to Nevill Coghill).
 About the House (New York, London, 1965; poems) (dedicated to Edmund and Elena Wilson).
 Collected Shorter Poems 1927-1957 (London, 1966; New York, 1967) (dedicated to Christopher Isherwood and Chester Kallman).
 Selected Poems (London, 1968) (includes some new revisions to previously published poems)
 Collected Longer Poems (London, 1968; New York, 1969).
 Secondary Worlds (London, New York, 1969; prose) (dedicated to Valerie Eliot).
 City Without Walls and Other Poems (London, New York, 1969) (dedicated to Peter Heyworth).
 A Certain World: A Commonplace Book (New York, London, 1970; quotations with commentary) (dedicated to Geoffrey Gorer).
 Academic Graffiti (London, New York, 1971; poems) (in memoriam Ogden Nash).
 Epistle to a Godson and Other Poems (London, New York, 1972) (dedicated to Orlan Fox).
 Forewords and Afterwords (New York, London, 1973; essays) (dedicated to Hannah Arendt).
 Thank You, Fog: Last Poems (London, New York, 1974) (dedicated to Michael and Marny Yates).

Posthumous books
Note: These are works that Auden did not intend to publish
 "The Prolific and the Devourer" (1939, prose; unfinished book; published in magazine form 1981, in book form, New York, 1993).
 Lectures on Shakespeare (1946–47, reconstructed and ed. by Arthur Kirsch, Princeton, 2001).

Anthologies edited by Auden
 The Poet's Tongue (2-vol and 1-vol edns., with John Garrett, London, 1935; introduction reprinted).
 The Oxford Book of Light Verse (Oxford, 1938; introduction reprinted) (dedicated to E. R. Dodds).
 The Portable Greek Reader (New York, 1948; introduction reprinted).
 Poets of the English Language (5 vols., with Norman Holmes Pearson; New York, 1950; London, 1952; introduction reprinted).
 The Faber Book of Modern American Verse (London, 1956; US edn., The Criterion book of Modern American Verse); introduction reprinted.
 The Viking Book of Aphorisms (with Louis Kronenberger; New York, 1964; UK edn., The Faber Book of Aphorisms); introduction reprinted.
 Nineteenth-Century British Minor Poets (New York, 1966; UK edn. Nineteenth-Century Minor Poets).

Film scripts and opera libretti
 Coal Face (1935, closing chorus for GPO Film Unit documentary).
 Negroes (1935, narrative for GPO Film Unit documentary); completed 1938 (without Auden's participation) as God's Chillun.
 Night Mail (1936, narrative for GPO Film Unit documentary, not published separately except as a program note).
 The Way to the Sea (1936, narrative for Strand Films documentary).
 Paul Bunyan (1941, libretto for operetta by Benjamin Britten; not published until 1976).
 The Rake's Progress (1951, with Chester Kallman, libretto for an opera by Igor Stravinsky).
 Elegy for Young Lovers (1956, with Chester Kallman, libretto for an opera by Hans Werner Henze).
 The Bassarids (1961, with Chester Kallman, libretto for an opera by Hans Werner Henze based on The Bacchae of Euripides).
 Runner (1962, documentary film narrative for National Film Board of Canada)
 Love's Labour's Lost (1973, with Chester Kallman, libretto for an opera by Nicolas Nabokov, based on Shakespeare's play).

Non-fiction
"Gresham's School" in Graham Greene (ed.) The Old School: Essays by Divers Hands (London: Jonathan Cape, 1934)

Edited selections of individual authors
 A Selection from the Poems of Alfred, Lord Tennyson (New York, 1944; UK edn. Tennyson: An Introduction and a Selection, London, 1946); introduction reprinted.
 Selected Prose and Poetry of Edgar Allan Poe (New York, 1950; rev. edn., 1956); introduction reprinted.
 The Living Thoughts of Kierkegaard (New York, 1952; UK edn., Kierkegaard: Selected and Introduced by W. H. Auden, London, 1955); introduction reprinted.
 A Choice of De La Mare's Verse (London, 1963); introduction reprinted.
 Louis MacNeice, Selected Poems (London, 1964); preface reprinted.
 George Gordon, Lord Byron, Selected Poetry and Prose (New York, 1966); introduction reprinted.
 G. K. Chesterton: A Selection from His Non-Fictional Prose (London, 1970); introduction reprinted.

Translations
 The Magic Flute (New York, 1956; London, 1957;  with Chester Kallman, English version of Emanuel Schikaneder's original German libretto to the Mozart opera Die Zauberflöte) (dedicated to Anne and Irving Weiss).
 Don Giovanni (New York, 1961; with Chester Kallman, English translation of Lorenzo da Ponte's original Italian libretto to the Mozart opera).
 Goethe, J. W. von. Italian Journey, tr. by W. H. Auden and Elizabeth Mayer (London, New York, 1963); introduction reprinted.
 The Elder Edda: A Selection, tr. by W. H. Auden and Paul B. Taylor (London, 1969; New York, 1970).

Editions published after Auden's death
 Collected Poems (1976, new edns. 1991, 2007, ed. by Edward Mendelson; Auden's final revisions).
 The English Auden: Poems, Essays, and Dramatic Writings, 1927-1939 (1977, ed. by Edward Mendelson).
 Selected Poems (1979, expanded edn. 2007, ed. by Edward Mendelson; includes earlier versions and discarded poems).
 Plays and Other Dramatic Writings, 1927-1938 (1989, first vol. of The Complete Works of W. H. Auden, ed. by Edward Mendelson).
 Libretti and Other Dramatic Writings, 1939-1973 (1993, second vol. of The Complete Works of W. H. Auden, ed. by Edward Mendelson).
 Tell Me the Truth About Love: Ten Poems (1994, later UK edns. have 15 poems).
 Juvenilia: Poems 1922-1928 (1994, ed. by Katherine Bucknell; expanded edn. 2003).
 As I Walked Out One Evening: Songs, Ballads, Lullabies, Limericks, and Other Light Verse (1995, ed. by Edward Mendelson).
 Prose and Travel Books in Prose and Verse: Volume I, 1926-1938 (1997, third vol. of The Complete Works of W. H. Auden, ed. by Edward Mendelson).
 W.H. Auden: Poems selected by John Fuller, (2000).
 Prose, Volume II: 1939-1948 (2002, fourth vol. of The Complete Works of W. H. Auden, ed. by Edward Mendelson).
 The Sea and the Mirror: A Commentary on Shakespeare's "The Tempest" (2003, ed. by Arthur Kirsch).
 Prose, Volume III: 1949-1955 (2008, fifth vol. of The Complete Works of W. H. Auden, ed. by Edward Mendelson).
 Prose, Volume IV: 1956-1962 (2010, sixth vol. of The Complete Works of W. H. Auden, ed. by Edward Mendelson).
 The Age of Anxiety (2011, ed. by Alan Jacobs)
 Prose, Volume V: 1963-1968 (2015, seventh vol. of The Complete Works of W. H. Auden, ed. by Edward Mendelson).
 Prose, Volume VI: 1969-1973 (2015, eighth vol. of The Complete Works of W. H. Auden, ed. by Edward Mendelson).

References

Further reading
Bibliography
Bloomfield, B. C., and Edward Mendelson (1972). W. H. Auden: A Bibliography 1924–1969. Charlottesville: University Press of Virginia. .

Post-1969 supplements to the item listed above are included in the following:

Auden, W. H.; ed. by Katherine Bucknell and Nicholas Jenkins (1990) "The Map of All My Youth": early works, friends and influences (Auden Studies 1). Oxford: Oxford University Press. .
Auden, W. H.; ed. by Katherine Bucknell and Nicholas Jenkins (1994). "The Language of Learning and the Language of Love": uncollected writings, new interpretations (Auden Studies 2). Oxford: Oxford University Press. .
Auden, W. H.; ed. by Katherine Bucknell and Nicholas Jenkins (1995). "In Solitude, For Company": W. H. Auden after 1940: unpublished prose and recent criticism (Auden Studies 3). Oxford: Oxford University Press. .

External links

Bibliographies by writer
Bibliographies of American writers
Bibliographies of British writers

Poetry bibliographies